Muleba is a small village in Kasai province, Democratic Republic of the Congo. The village is located on the Muleba Route, near the Lulua River, southwest of Luebo and between Kasongo, and Shamakata and Zembele.

References

Populated places in Kasaï Province